Maria B. Dwight is an American activist with a particular focus on improving lives for the aging and elderly, particularly regarding housing issues. She is a planner of multicultural communities as well as a consultant notable for having a center in Holyoke named after her called the Maria B. Dwight Geriatric and Rehabilitation Center in 1977. Her views on issues affecting the elderly have been quoted in USA Today and the New York Times. She works in Santa Monica, California.

Regarding the issue of the elderly and community, she said:

Dwight has commented on issues relating to the gay community regarding aging; she said that gay men and lesbians are often closer to gay "families of choice" rather than to their biological families and she finds a strong need for communities to serve the elderly population in urban areas. She contributed $200 to oppose a ban on gay marriage according to the Los Angeles Times. She believes that as the baby boomer generation moves into retirement, there will be a "two-class society" and that boomers will be agents of change regarding the health care system. She said:

References

External links 
 Maria Dwight biography

Living people
Activists from California
American management consultants
People from Santa Monica, California
Year of birth missing (living people)